Harney County School District 3 (HCSD3) is a school district headquartered in Burns, Oregon. It includes Burns and Hines.

In 2016 Steve Quick was hired as superintendent. He previously was at Oroville, Washington schools.

Previously the Harney Educational Service District (Harney ESD) provided some services to the school district. In 2019 HCSD3 's board voted to begin doing these services in-house, with Harney ESD services ending June 30 of that year.

Schools
 Burns High School
 Hines Middle School
 Slater Elementary School

 Special schools
 Monroe School - The school of the Eastern Oregon Youth Correctional Facility of the Oregon Youth Authority.

References

External links
 Harney County School District 3 - Alternate URL
School districts in Oregon
Education in Harney County, Oregon